Canyon, formerly known as Sequoya, is an unincorporated community located near the border of Contra Costa and Alameda counties, in the U.S. state of California. It is situated between Oakland and Moraga in the San Francisco Bay Area. The community is named for its location in the upper canyon of San Leandro Creek along the eastern slope of the Berkeley Hills.  Canyon lies at an elevation of 1138 feet (347 m).

The community is mainly traversed by Pinehurst Road and Canyon Road. The homes of the community are nestled amongst the steep, narrow private roads and footpaths that extend from the redwood groves and ferns along the creek, through the mixed live oak, bay, and madrone forests on the steep hillsides, up to the chaparral and knobcone pines that grow along the ridge.

History

Canyon has a colorful history.  Logging camps and notorious saloons helped establish a local reputation for rowdiness in the nineteenth century. A vast forest known as the Moraga Redwoods once covered the valley that is now Canyon. An extant fire trail west of the spot where Pinehurst Road makes a sharp hairpin turn near Huckleberry Botanic Regional Preserve was previously known as Winding Way on some maps, and was originally an old 19th century logging road built by Hiram Thorn. In the 1850s, Thorn operated a mill on the site. Thorn built the road to bring redwood logs out of the forest and to his mill, and then over the mountain into Oakland via the Temescal Creek route on the northwest edge of Montclair Village. The Oakland part of the route is now known as Thornhill Road.

In the first half of the 20th century, the local water company, East Bay Municipal Utilities District, purchased much land south of town. They constructed the Upper San Leandro Reservoir, which slowly as it filled up, flooded the former towns of Valle Vista and Redwood. The reservoir also flooded several neighborhoods of Canyon itself. In fact, the only reason Canyon is not the size of neighboring Moraga is because of a lack of a viable water resource. The few people that do live there are mostly commuters and retired people who like the town's seclusion, with close proximity to San Francisco, Oakland, and San Jose.

Earlier in the 20th century, the Sacramento Northern Railway ran through the canyon for which the community is named. The rails ran on a bench (still present) above Pinehurst Road, upon exiting a long tunnel from Oakland at the site of Thorn's road. The eastern portal (called Eastport by the railroad) just north of Canyon was buried by a landslide in 1980 and is no longer visible, but was located on the inside of the hairpin turn on Pinehurst Road.

In the late 1960s, Canyon became a center of political and social protest and creative alternative lifestyles. Canyon Cinema of San Francisco was founded by neighbors here in the 1960s. In the summer of 1967 Country Joe and the Fish with the Youngbloods played a benefit for the Canyon School.

Today's residents still work together to maintain their own roads and water systems, and Canyon Community Association volunteers provide mediation services, emergency planning, and interface with county and state agencies. Much of the land beyond the community is owned by the East Bay Municipal Utility District (EBMUD).

Infrastructure

The only public services in the community are the local post office (ZIP Code 94516) where all mail is picked up and the Canyon School, a 68-student K-8 public school, located on Pinehurst Road on the banks of the Upper San Leandro Creek. A notion of the community's unconventionality may be gleaned from the fact that the school lunch menu features organic milk and produce, Niman Ranch beef, and hormone and antibiotic free chicken. The community is in area code 925.

As John van der Zee wrote in his book about the town, Canyon (1972): 

Between 2011 and 2013, a Carmelite monastery was located on a ranch in the western area of the town. The nuns moved in 2014 to a building in the nearby town of Kensington, California.

Climate
Canyon enjoys a cool summer Mediterranean climate (Koppen classification csb) similar to that of the nearby city of Oakland, California, though slightly warmer. Fog maintains the cool summer weather.

Timeline
 1850s: First settlers
 1918: First Canyon School is built
 1922: Canyon Post Office is built

Further reading
John van der Zee, Canyon: The Story of the Last Rustic Community in Metropolitan America, 1972.

References

External links 
 Canyon School

Unincorporated communities in Alameda County, California
Unincorporated communities in Contra Costa County, California
Berkeley Hills
Logging communities in the United States
Unincorporated communities in California